Yayla is the Turkish for yaylak. In the table below, some of the famous yaylas are listed (in geographical order):

 
Turkey geography-related lists